The Southern Area League was the regional third and then regional second tier of speedway racing in the United Kingdom for Southern British teams as a replacement for the defunct Southern League.

The league ran for three seasons from 1954 to 1956 as the regional third tier and then one season in 1957 as the regional second tier before league racing disappeared entirely below National League level in 1958. It returned for a final season in 1959.

Champions

See also
List of United Kingdom Speedway League Champions

References

 
Speedway leagues
Speedway competitions in the United Kingdom